Michael Schärer (born 23 December 1996) is a Swiss snowboarder. He competed in the 2018 Winter Olympics.

References

1996 births
Living people
Snowboarders at the 2018 Winter Olympics
Swiss male snowboarders
Olympic snowboarders of Switzerland
21st-century Swiss people